Ariane Nel (born 6 March 1996) is a South African sprinter. She competed in the women's 4 × 400 metres relay at the 2017 World Championships in Athletics.

References

External links
 

1996 births
Living people
South African female sprinters
World Athletics Championships athletes for South Africa
Place of birth missing (living people)
20th-century South African women
21st-century South African women